Rezqabad (also Romanized as Rezqābād) is a village in Ganjabad Rural District, Esmaili District, Anbarabad County, Kerman Province, Iran. At the 2006 census, its population was 95, in 22 families.

References 

Populated places in Anbarabad County